5-Hydroxy-2(5H)-furanone is a furanone derived from oxidation of furfural using singlet oxygen. This oxidation is carried out generally in methanol or ethanol with a sensitizer like methylene blue or Rose bengal. The mechanism of this reaction is depicted as below.

Uses
5-Hydroxy-2(5H)-furanone is a potent pesticide and a four carbon building block for various heterocycles.

Chemical properties
5-Hydroxy-2(5H)-furanone exists in chemical equilibrium with its isomer, cis-β-formylacrylic acid, in ring-chain tautomerism:

Under some conditions the compound will isomerize into succinic anhydride. Upon heating in strongly basic solution (pH > 9) this isomer will hydrate to succinic acid.

See also
 Butenolide
 Tetronic acid

References

Furanones
Secondary alcohols
Pesticides
Insecticides
Fungicides